The Kayeri is a mushroom-like creature who are apart of the folk beliefs of the Cuiva people. They are described as large humanoids with a mushroom cap on top of their heads. It is said that they appear after the rainy season, when they emerge from the ground to hunt cattle (which their diet almost exclusively consists of). They also engage in many other acts, such as theft, murder, kidnappings, and rape. It is said that the most effective way to kill them is to shoot them in the kidney with a bone-tipped arrow.

References 

Indigenous South American legendary creatures
Mythological monsters